About Group is an English improvisational rock band established in 2009, formed by members of Hot Chip, This Heat, and Spiritualized. Based in London, the group is known for making albums without practicing the songs before or playing together first.

Musical history
About Group made its first album in 2009, released on John Coxon's own Treader label. Although having never played before, they recorded the album in a day and debuted it at Ornette Coleman's Meltdown festival at the Queen Elizabeth Hall.

In February 2011, About Group announced its plans for a second album, called "Start & Complete", to be released on Domino Records. Similar to their first album, "Start & Complete" was also recorded in one day, in the Abbey Road Studios. It was released to mixed to positive reviews.

"Between the Walls" was About Group's third album, released in July 2013 by Domino Records, to more positive reviews. It was the final album before Hayward left the band.

Discography

Albums

Singles and EPs

References

External links
 
 
 

English indie rock groups
Musical groups from London
Musical groups established in 2009
2009 establishments in England
Domino Recording Company artists